Microtis eremaea, commonly known as the slender mignonette orchid or inland onion orchid is a species of orchid endemic to the south-west of Western Australia and western South Australia. It has a single thin, hollow, onion-like leaf and up to fifty small greenish-yellow flowers. The flowers have a distinctive heart-shaped labellum and the orchid generally grows in more inland areas than most other onion orchids.

Description
Flowering occurs from August to October.

Taxonomy and naming
Microtis eremaea was first formally described in 1996 by Robert Bates from a specimen collected on a granite outcrop west of Mount Magnet and the description was published in Journal of the Adelaide Botanic Garden. The specific epithet (eremaea) is derived from Latin eremaea, referring to the arid habitat of this orchid.

Distribution and habitat
Microtis eremaea mostly grows on granite outcrops or near temporary watercourses, sometimes forming dense colonies. It is found between Balladonia and Cue in Western Australia and in the west of South Australia.

Conservation
Microtis eremaea is classified as "not threatened" by the Western Australian Government Department of Parks and Wildlife.

References

External links
 

eremaea
Endemic orchids of Australia
Orchids of Western Australia
Plants described in 1996